The following is a list of Major League Baseball players, retired or active.

Mc-Mg

References

External links
Last Names starting with M – Baseball-Reference.com

 Mc